Dancemania 5 is the fifth set in the Dancemania series of dance music compilation albums, released in 1997 by EMI Music Japan.

The album debuted at #16 on Oricon's weekly album chart in May 1997 and reached #5 the next week, appearing on the yearly best-selling album chart at #98 in 1997 with 227,310 copies sold, along with its predecessor, 4, which ranked #92.


Tracks

Further details

The album's overall average tempo is 142 bpm;
The slowest track is "Cyber Queen" (#9) at 130 bpm.
The fastest track is "I'm Not in Love" (#22) at 185 bpm.
The album contains 9 covers or remixes.
#5 "I Was Born to Love You" is a cover of Queen's "I Was Born to Love You".
#6 "Physical" is a cover of Olivia Newton-John's "Physical".
#7 "Dancing Queen" is a cover of ABBA's "Dancing Queen".
#8 "Ai no Corrida" is a cover of Quincy Jones' "Ai no Corrida".
#9 "Cyber Queen" sampled Richard Clayderman's "Ballade pour Adeline".
#14 "Layla" is a cover of Derek & The Dominos' "Layla", sampling Catch 22's "Boogie Town" and LL Cool J's "It Gets No Rougher".
#18 "Independent Love Song" is a cover of Scarlet's "Independent Love Song".
#21 "Sun Always Shines on TV" is a cover of a-ha's "The Sun Always Shines on T.V.".
#22 "I'm Not in Love" is a cover of 10cc's "I'm Not in Love".
Several tracks on the album, including different remixes, can also be found on other Dancemania albums such as 9, X4, X9, Delux 2, Delux 4, Extra, Diamond, Diamond Complete Edition, Zip Mania, Zip Mania II, Zip Mania Best, Speed 1, Happy Paradise, Happy Paradise 2, Bass #1, Best Red, Club the Earth II or Disco Groove.

References

5
1997 compilation albums
Dance music compilation albums